John Whichcord Sr. (1790–1860) was a British architect who worked  in  Maidstone, Kent and designed  many public and institutional buildings in the town.

Life

Whichcord, the son of a surveyor,  was born in Devizes, Wiltshire. He was articled to the Bath architect Charles Harcourt Masters  and then worked in the drawing office of the architect of the London Docks, Daniel Asher Alexander, who was also engaged on the prison at Maidstone. In 1819 Whichcord took over the post of surveyor of Maidstone gaol, and two years later also became surveyor of Canterbury gaol. In 1825, when the county surveyor of Kent was dismissed, Whichcord was appointed to the post. His works in the county included the Maidstone Union Workhouse (1836), the Kent Fire Offices, the  Maidstone Corn Exchange, and the West Kent Infirmary. He was also surveyor to the Medway Navigation Company, carrying out various works on the river, including tidal locks.  The Kent County Lunatic Asylum  is described as his Magnum Opus by John Newman (Buildings of England Series, 1969).

He designed  the new churches of  St John, Blindley Heath in Surrey, and Holy Trinity, Maidstone, St Stephen, Tovil, Holy Trinity, East Peckham, St Mary the Virgin, Platt, and Christ Church  at Dunkirk, near Faversham, all in   Kent. He also produced plans for enlargement or reseating of a number of existing ones, including St Peter's Church, Maidstone.

His son John Whichcord Jr. (1823–1885) was a notable architect.

References

External links
Maidstone Union Workhouse on the Workhouse website
Oakwood Hospital on the County Asylums website

1790 births
1860 deaths
19th-century English architects
Architects from Kent
Architects from Wiltshire
People from Devizes
People from Maidstone